The 2017–18 Rangers F.C. season was the 138th season of competitive football by Rangers. It is their second consecutive season in the top tier of Scottish football, having been promoted from the Scottish Championship at the end of the 2015–16 season. Rangers also competed in the 
Scottish League Cup and the Scottish Cup.

Results & fixtures

Pre-season and friendlies

Scottish Premiership

League Cup

Scottish Cup

Europa League

Squad statistics
The table below includes all players registered with the SPFL as part of the Rangers squad for 2017–18 season. They may not have made an appearance.

Appearances, goals and discipline
{| class="wikitable sortable" style="text-align:center"
|-
!rowspan="2" style="background:#00f; color:white;" |No.
!rowspan="2" style="background:#00f; color:white;" |Pos.
!rowspan="2" style="background:#00f; color:white;" |Nat.
!rowspan="2" style="background:#00f; color:white;" |Name
!colspan="2" style="background:#00f; color:white;" |Totals
!colspan="2" style="background:#00f; color:white;" |Scottish Premiership
!colspan="2" style="background:#00f; color:white;" |Scottish Cup
!colspan="2" style="background:#00f; color:white;" |League Cup
!colspan="2" style="background:#00f; color:white;" |Europa League
!colspan="2" style="background:#00f; color:white;" |Discipline
|-
!Apps
!Goals
!Apps
!Goals
!Apps
!Goals
!Apps
!Goals
!Apps
!Goals
!
!
|-
||1||0
||5||0
||2||0
||2||0
||0||0
||0||0
||2||4
||0||0
||6||0
||7||0
||0||0
||2||0
||3||0
||1||0
||2||0
||11||0
||3||0
||4||0
||10||1
||2||0
||0||0
||4||0
||3||0
||0||0
||0||0
||0||0
||1||0
||1||0
||0||0
||6||1
||0||0
||0||0
||1||0
|-
! colspan="16" style="background:#DCDCDC; text-align:center" | Players transferred or loaned out during the season
||3||0
||2||0
||0||0
||1||0
||0||0
||0||0
||0||0
||0||0
||0||0
||0||0

Appearances (starts and substitute appearances) and goals include those in Scottish Premiership, League Cup, Scottish Cup, and the UEFA Europa League.

Club statistics

Competition Overview

League table

Management statistics
Last updated 15 April 2018

Club

Staff

Transfers

Players in

Players out

Loans in

Loans out

Notes

References

2017-18
Scottish football clubs 2017–18 season
2017–18 UEFA Europa League participants seasons